Borzelan-e Olya (also Romanized as Borzelān-e ‘Olyā; also known as Borzelān-e Bālā, Borzolān, and Borzolān-e Bālā) is a village in Qushkhaneh-ye Pain Rural District, Qushkhaneh District, Shirvan County, North Khorasan Province, Iran. At the 2006 census, its population was 769, in 155 families.

References 

Populated places in Shirvan County